Alsford is a surname. Notable people with the surname include:

Julian Alsford (born 1972), English footballer 
Niki Alsford, British academic
Walter Alsford (1911–1968), English footballer

See also
Alford (surname)